Mananjary Airport   is an airport in Mananjary, Vatovavy-Fitovinany Region, Madagascar, located on the east coast on the island.

Airlines and destinations

References

Airports in Madagascar
Vatovavy-Fitovinany